Charles Russell McCarron (1891 – January 28, 1919) was a United States Tin Pan Alley composer and lyricist. McCarron is credited on such numbers as "Fido Is a Hot Dog Now", "Your Lips Are No Man's Land But Mine", "Our Country's In It Now, We've Got to Win It Now", and "Eve Wasn't Modest 'till She Ate that Apple". He collaborated with other composers including Albert Von Tilzer, Carey Morgan, and Chris Smith.

He died of pneumonia at his home in New York on January 28, 1919 at age 27.

Selected works
Blues My Naughty Sweetie Gives to Me (1919 song with Carey Morgan and Arthur N. Swanstone [aka "Arthur Swanstrom"])
Our Country's in It Now! (We've Got to Win It Now), 1918 song
Down in Honky Tonky Town (1916 w. Charles McCarron m. Chris Smith)
The Russians Were Rushin', The Yanks Started Yankin' with lyrics by with Carey Morgan
When the Lusitania Went Down (1915 with Nathaniel Vincent)
When Old Bill Bailey Plays the Ukalele (1915 with Nathaniel Vincent)
"Oh Helen!" (a comedy stuttering song), composed with Carey Morgan

References

External links
 
McCarron.com
Charles McCarron portrait photograph
MIDI music of 'Oh, Helen'

1891 births
1919 deaths
American male composers
20th-century American composers
20th-century American male musicians